The Battle of Shimbra Kure ("chickpea swamp") was fought on 9 March 1529 between the forces of Adal led by Imam Ahmad ibn Ibrahim al-Ghazi, and the Abyssinian army, under Dawit II (Lebna Dengel). 

Arab Faqīh states many Somalis on the left flank deserted and the Abyssinians pursued killing a large number of their men, but the Harla on the right flank held their ground. According to Merid Wolde Aregay, the Harari cavalry or the Malassay with support from the Arab cuirassiers (a type of armoured, pistol-carrying cavalry) shifted the momentum in favor of the Adalites. The army of Imam Ahmad prevailed, and were in control of the field at the end of the battle. Abyssinians suffered heavy casualties.

Despite this success, and despite his desire to capture and hold the Emperor's palace at Badeqe, Imam Ahmad, in part also to appease his restive men, withdrew from the highlands and did not return to directly engage the Ethiopian army for two years. Enrico Cerulli asserts that following the battle, the Harari troops refused to carry out Imam Ahmad's orders to subjugate Abyssinia, stating that doing so would defy the tradition of their ancestors. According to Cerulli, the Harari aristocracy dreaded the potential consequences of the Muslim base relocating to Abyssinia.

Some authorities, such as Richard Pankhurst, attribute Imam Ahmad's success to the presence amongst his followers of an elite company of matchlockmen. If this is the case, then this battle was the first time Ethiopian forces had to fight against a force equipped with firearms.

References

1529 in Africa
Shimbra Kure
Shimbra Kure
Shimbra Kure
Shimbra Kure